Trousseau packing is the specialized packaging for wedding gifts given to the bride and her to-be family including her husband. These gifts are ceremoniously given before few days of marriage. The tradition in India is to give away articles that the new couple would need as part of their life together. The items may include a car, jewelry, bed, dressing table, clothes, Saree etc. Dowry is an illegal practice, but India marriages being deep-rooted in tradition, follow the practice of giving dowry to the groom's family.

The term ‘trousseau’ originates from a French word that means ‘bundle’. It is generally used for a bundle of clothes, money, and other articles that a bride gets in her marriage. This giving of articles, clothing, and money is an important part of the Indian wedding. This practice is an age old tradition and even today in the modern times it is considered to be an earthly treasure.

Specialty about trousseau packing
Unlike other gift packaging, items are wrapped in traditional materials like gold or silver paper. They are decorated with ornaments. Traditionally, articles for the bridegroom's family are in 11, 21, 51, 101 or 201 quantities. These numbers are thought to be lucky; the extra 1 signifies Sagan or luck.

Wedding gifts